The Projectionist is a 2019 Dominican drama film directed by José María Cabral. It was selected as the Dominican entry for the Best International Feature Film at the 92nd Academy Awards, but it was not nominated.

Plot
Middle-aged Eliseo, a projectionist, travels to rural towns to screen his films. He meets a young woman named Rubi and takes her on the road.

Cast
 Félix Germán as Eliseo Layo
 Cindy Galán as Rubí
 Lia Briones as Koda

See also
 List of submissions to the 92nd Academy Awards for Best International Feature Film
 List of Dominican submissions for the Academy Award for Best International Feature Film

References

External links
 

2019 films
2019 drama films
Dominican Republic drama films
2010s Spanish-language films